The 2021–22 UCF Knights men's basketball team represented the University of Central Florida during the 2021–22 NCAA Division I men's basketball season. The Knights competed as members of the American Athletic Conference. The Knights, in the program's 53rd season of basketball, were led by sixth-year head coach Johnny Dawkins and played their home games at the Addition Financial Arena on the university's main campus in Orlando, Florida. They finished the season 18–12, 9–9 in AAC Play to finish in 6th place. They defeated South Florida in the First Round of the AAC Tournament before losing in the quarterfinals to Memphis.

Previous season
The Knights finished the 2020–21 season 10–11 overall and 8–10 in AAC play to finish in sixth place. They defeated East Carolina in the first round of the AAC tournament before losing to Memphis in the quarterfinals.

Offseason

Departures

Incoming transfers

2021 recruiting class

2022 Recruiting class

Roster

Schedule and results

|-
!colspan=12 style=| Regular season

|-
!colspan=12 style=| AAC tournament

Source

References

UCF Knights men's basketball seasons
UCF
UCF Knights men's basketball
UCF Knights men's basketball